Capital Department (Spanish: Departamento Capital) may refer to several departments of Argentine provinces:

 Capital Department, Catamarca (Catamarca Province)
 Capital Department, Corrientes (Corrientes Province)
 Capital Department, Córdoba (Córdoba Province)
 Capital Department, La Pampa (La Pampa Province)
 Capital Department, La Rioja (La Rioja Province)
 Capital Department, Mendoza (Mendoza Province)
 Capital Department, Misiones (Misiones Province)
 Capital Department, Salta (Salta Province), a department located in Salta Province, Argentina. It is the department of the provincial capital, the city of Salta, and the most populated one
 Capital Department, San Juan (San Juan Province), a department in the San Juan Province (Argentina). Where totally dominated a landscape completely urbanized with a high population density and containing the City of San Juan, focusing on all the power and financial administration of the province
 Capital Department, Santiago del Estero (Santiago del Estero Province)
 Capital Department, Tucumán (Tucumán Province), a department located in the center-north of the Tucumán Province, Argentina

See also 

 La Capital Department (disambiguation), the other utilized form

Department name disambiguation pages